Concord Township is one of twenty-two townships in Adams County, Illinois, United States. As of the 2020 census, its population was 279 and it contained 111 housing units.

Geography

Unincorporated towns
 Kellerville

Cemeteries
The township contains six cemeteries: Amen, Concord, Dunkard, Higley Family, Jefferson and Wallace.

Demographics
As of the 2020 census there were 279 people, 122 households, and 122 families residing in the township. The racial makeup of the township was 98.57% White, 0.00% African American, 0.00% Native American, 0.00% Asian, 0.00% Pacific Islander, 0.00% from other races, and 1.43% from two or more races. Hispanic or Latino of any race were 0.36% of the population.

There were 122 households, out of which 72.10% had children under the age of 18 living with them, 87.70% were married couples living together, none had a female householder with no spouse present, and none were non-families. No households were made up of individuals. The average household size was 4.07 and the average family size was 4.07.

The township's age distribution consisted of 42.9% under the age of 18, 5.0% from 18 to 24, 25.7% from 25 to 44, 22.3% from 45 to 64, and 4.0% who were 65 years of age or older. The median age was 28.3 years. For every 100 females, there were 218.6 males. For every 100 females age 18 and over, there were 123.6 males.

The median income for a household in the township was $55,000, and the median income for a family was $55,000. Males had a median income of $23,821 versus $13,700 for females. The per capita income for the township was $17,847. About 9.0% of families and 12.7% of the population were below the poverty line, including 19.2% of those under age 18 and 0.0% of those age 65 or over.

School districts
 Camp Point Community Unit School District 3

Political districts
 Illinois' 18th congressional district
 State House District 93
 State Senate District 47

References
 
 United States Census Bureau 2007 TIGER/Line Shapefiles
 United States National Atlas

External links
 List of Adams County township trustees
 City-Data.com
 Illinois State Archives

Townships in Adams County, Illinois
1849 establishments in Illinois
Townships in Illinois